Turpentine is the oleoresin of conifers (crude turpentine) or the volatile oil part thereof (oil of turpentine).

Turpentine may also refer to:
The resin of terebinth, the original meaning of turpentine
White spirit, the cheaper, mineral oil based replacement for turpentine 
"Turpentine" (song), a 1990 song by grunge band Hole
Mr. Turpentine, Charlie Bucket's schoolteacher and fictional character in Willy Wonka and the Chocolate Factory

Plants
Scrub turpentine (disambiguation)
Turpentine bush (disambiguation)
Turpentine tree (disambiguation)